The Chaya is a river in Buryatia and Irkutsk Oblast, Russia. The Chaya flows across Kirensky District, there are no settlements on the banks of the river.

In the International scale of river difficulty the Chaya is a Class IV-V destination for rafting and kayaking.

Course  
The Chaya is a right tributary of the Lena. It has its sources in an alpine lake of the Upper Angara Range. It flows mainly northwards at the bottom of a glacial valley in its upper course. Then it flows across the North Baikal Highlands within a narrow valley, with the Akitkan Range to the west, easing into the Prebaikal Depression in a roughly NNW direction, where its channel divides into branches. The riverbed is very rocky all along.

The main tributaries of the Chaya are the Magdana, Nalimda and Limpeya from the right, and the Olokit, Abchada and Kilyakta from the left. Snow falls usually from November to March in the area of the river.

Flora and fauna
There are larch forests all along the banks of the Chaya, with Siberian spruce in its lower course. Grayling, whitefish and lenok are among the fish species found in the waters of the river.

See also
List of rivers of Russia

References

External links 
 

Rivers of Buryatia
Rivers of Irkutsk Oblast